William Joseph McCormack Jr. (born January 13, 1974) is an American actor, executive producer, screenwriter, and film director. He is best known for his short film If Anything Happens I Love You (2020), which earned him the Academy Award for Best Animated Short Film.

McCormack is also known for writing the screenplay for Celeste and Jesse Forever (2012) and the story for Toy Story 4 (2019), the former of which earned him nominations for the Independent Spirit Award for Best First Screenplay and the Black Reel Award for Outstanding Screenplay, Adapted or Original. He appeared in the television series The Sopranos (1999–2001), Brothers & Sisters (2008–2009), and In Plain Sight (2008–2012), as well as the films American Outlaws (2001), Syriana (2005), and A Wrinkle in Time (2018). He won a Lucille Lortel Award for his role in the off-Broadway one-act play The Long Christmas Ride Home (2003).

Early life and education
McCormack was born on January 13, 1974, in Plainfield, New Jersey, to William Sr. and Norah Magdalene (née Ross) McCormack. He has two older sisters, Mary, an actress, and Bridget, a Michigan Supreme Court Justice and former University of Michigan law professor. He graduated from Trinity College in Hartford, Connecticut.

Career
McCormack's key television roles include Jason La Penna on The Sopranos (1999–2001). More recently, he played the role of Leo Spiller, brother of lead character Lucy Spiller (Courteney Cox), in the FX series Dirt. He also played a recurring role as the FBI agent in the television drama In Plain Sight, which stars his older sister, Mary.

In 1996, McCormack appeared on Broadway at the Criterion Center Stage Right as a member of the ensemble in a revival of the drama play Summer and Smoke (1948) by Tennessee Williams, produced by The Roundabout Theatre Company. He has also appeared in two Off-Broadway theatre productions, Chinese Friends and The Long Christmas Ride Home. McCormack and Rashida Jones worked on the script of Toy Story 4. They ultimately withdrew from the project in November 2017, and received "story by" credit.

Personal life
As of 2018, he is engaged to actress Emily Arlook.

Filmography and television work

Stage work

Awards and nominations

See also

 Lists of American writers

References

External links
 
 
 

1974 births
Living people
American male film actors
American male stage actors
American male television actors
American film producers
American male screenwriters
American animated film directors
American documentary film directors
20th-century American male actors
21st-century American male actors
21st-century American screenwriters
Male actors from New Jersey
Film producers from New Jersey
Screenwriters from New Jersey
Film directors from New Jersey
People from Plainfield, New Jersey
Writers from Plainfield, New Jersey
Trinity College (Connecticut) alumni
21st-century American male writers
Directors of Best Animated Short Academy Award winners
Television producers from New Jersey